The Gina Bachauer International Piano Competition is based in Salt Lake City, Utah and is the second largest piano competition in the United States.

The competition has three age categories:  the International Artists Competition for pianists aged 19–32, the Young Artist Competition ages 15–18, and the Junior Competition ages 11–14.

The competition is managed by the Gina Bachauer International Piano Foundation, a non-profit organization.  The Foundation hosts regular piano competitions, concerts, and festivals on a four-year cycle.

History
The Gina Bachauer International Piano Competition was founded in 1976 by Paul Pollei, a member of the piano faculty at Brigham Young University.  It was hosted by the university as part of the Summer Piano Festival from 1976 to 1980.  In 1978 Gina Bachauer's widower, Alec Sherman, announced that the name of Gina Bachauer was to be given to the Competition in honor of his wife, the celebrated Greek pianist who was popular in Utah, having appeared with Maurice Abravanel and the Utah Symphony.

The Gina Bachauer International Piano Competition became part of the Utah Symphony in 1980 and relocated to Salt Lake City.  The competition was held every other year during the month of June and the Gold Medalist received a Steinway grand piano and a recital debut in New York City.  In 1983, the Foundation was admitted as a member of the World Federation of International Music Competitions based in Geneva, Switzerland.  Candidates from more than 40 countries have participated as contestants in the Foundation’s competitions.

More than 1,000 pianists have competed in the Gina Bachauer International Piano Competitions and cash prizes totaling more than $300,000 have been awarded. The competition is renowned for launching the careers of duo-pianists Gail Niwa and Lori Sims.

Winners

Gold Medal winners of the International Artists Competition:
 2018 – Changyong Shin, South Korea
 2014 – Andrey Gugnin, Russia
 2010 – Lukas Geniušas, Lithuania
 2006 – Stephen Beus, USA
 2002 – Cédric Pescia, Switzerland
 1998 – Lori Sims, USA
 1994 – Nicholas Angelich, USA
 1991 – Gail Niwa, USA
 1988 – Xiang-Dong Kong, China
 1986 – Alec Chien, China
 1984 – David Buechner, USA
 1982 – Michael Gurt, USA
 1980 – Duane Hulbert, USA
 1979 – Panayis Lyras, USA
 1978 – Arthur Greene, USA
 1977 – Christopher Giles, USA
 1976 – Douglas Humpherys, USA

Other notable laureates include Armen Babakhanian (1991), Mehmet Okonsar (1991), Violetta Egorova (1991), Kevin Kenner (1988), Vassily Primakov (2002), Lev Vinocour (2002), Luiza Borac (1998), Young Artists laureates Yundi Li (1999), Leonardo Colafelice (2012), Aimi Kobayashi (2012), and Junior laureates Nareh Arghamanyan (2000), Colleen Lee (1993), Rachel Cheung (2004), Aristo Sham (2008), Tony Yike Yang (2012).

Critical response
Several members of the press have noted the high caliber of talent of Bachauer competitors.  The Deseret News said "only the best try out for the Gina Bachauer International Piano Competition."   CBC News said "those chosen are considered the cream of the young virtuoso world. Finalists often end up being offered scholarships to music academies, moving on to classical music careers."

See also 
 American Protege International Piano and Strings Competition International Competition for Young Pianists and Professionals with winners performing at Carnegie Hall, New York Music Competition in Carnegie Hall New York 國際音樂比賽
 Gina Bachauer International Piano Foundation
 World Federation of International Music Competitions
 List of Classical Music Competitions
 Bakitone International
 Gina Bachauer
 Paul Pollei

References

External links 
 Bachauer Website
 Contest Hits Chord for Youths Worldwide 
 16-year-old Girl Captures Prestigious Piano Competition
 Stephen Beus Wins 2006 Gina Bachauer International Piano Competition
 Gina Bachauer Competition Display and Archive Project 
 Gina Bachauer Piano Competition Set to Open

Music of Utah
Piano competitions in the United States